Open Your Eyes is an American rock band from Chicago, IL. Their debut album, "Truth or Consequences", was released on March 25, 2016, and peaked at #25 on the Billboard Heatseekers chart.
OYE is currently recording their sophomore album with producers Matt Good of From First To Last , & Ben Bruce of Asking Alexandria .

History
In 2013 Justin King and Comron Fouladi were heading to the studio with producer Brandon Saller of Atreyu to work on a new record for their band Athel.  The band had drummer Shane Kippel of Degrassi: The Next Generation filling in for the album.  Shortly into the experience Comron and Justin had thought this isn't Athel anymore and wanted to start a new project with new members and formed Open Your Eyes. Shortly after the band recruited guitarist Ryan Steinberg. Kippel could not commit to the new project, the band added Sandra Alva on drums shortly after her departure with former band Modern Day Escape following her departure from Hollywood-based rock band Black Veil Brides. In 2017 OYE decided to part ways with Alva.

Discography
Studio albums
 Truth or Consequence - 2016
 TBA - 2018

Members
 Justin King – lead vocals, lead guitar
 Comron Fouladi – bass guitar, backing vocals
 Ryan Steinberg – rhythm guitar, backing vocals

Former members
 Sandra Alvarenga - Drums  (2014-2017)

References

Rock music groups from Illinois
Musical groups from Chicago